Cristhian Andrey Mosquera Ibargüen (born 27 June 2004) is a Spanish professional footballer who plays mainly as a central defender for Valencia CF Mestalla.

Early life 
Born in Alicante, Valencian Community to Colombian parents, Mosquera first played basketball in his hometown, before joining futsal team San Blas Cañavate, as his cousin was playing there and they were missing a player for a youth tournament. Having later moved to play in -based team SCD Carolinas, he eventually joined the city main football club, Hércules CF.

Club career 
Mosquera joined Valencia CF's youth setup in 2016, aged 12. On 22 August 2020, while still in the Juvenil A squad, he renewed his contract with the club until 2023. He made his senior debut with the reserves on 4 September 2021, starting in a 3–1 Tercera División RFEF home win over CD Castellón B.

Having already featured on the bench for a few Liga fixtures that season, he made his first team debut on the 16 January 2022, starting in a 1–0 away win over CD Atlético Baleares, for the season's Copa del Rey. Playing every minutes of the game in the center of a 3-men defense, his coach José Bordalás praised him as the best on the field that night. At the age of 17 years, six months and 23 days, he became the eight-youngest player in the club's history, and the youngest centre-back.

Set to further renew his contract with the Che until 2025, Mosquera made his La Liga debut on the 19 January 2022 by starting in a 1–1 draw against Sevilla FC, again impressing in the axis of the defense for what was a difficult game against the likes of Rafa Mir. This made him the fourth-youngest footballer to ever play in La Liga with Los murciélagos, surpassing players such as Ferran Torres, Lee Kang-in or Yunus Musah.

International career
Mosquera represented Spain at under-15, under-16 and under-18 levels, winning a friendly tournament with the latter in October 2021, against Turkey, Romania and Portugal.

He also holds a Colombian passport, which makes him eligible to play for La Tricolor as well as Spain.

Style of play 
Mainly playing as a centre-back during his time at Valencia's academy, Mosquera can also play as a full-back on both sides. When he made the switch from futsal to association football as a youngster, he actually played as a winger, where he first showed his athletic abilities.

Already a strong physical presence despite his young age, he is described as a quick defender, with good anticipation and ability to play the ball, helping his team move forward. Miguel Ángel Angulo – his coach at Mestalla – described the youngster's profile as characterized by his "physical condition and good technical qualities, powerful in the air, and mature for his age".

Career statistics

Club

References

External links

2004 births
Living people
Spanish footballers
Spanish people of Colombian descent
Sportspeople of Colombian descent
People with acquired Colombian citizenship
Colombian footballers
Spain youth international footballers
Association football defenders
Footballers from Alicante
Valencia CF Mestalla footballers
Valencia CF players
La Liga players
Segunda Federación players
Tercera Federación players